"If I Can't Have You" is a disco song written by the Bee Gees in 1977. The song initially appeared on the Saturday Night Fever soundtrack in a version by Yvonne Elliman, released in November 1977. The Bee Gees' own version appeared a month later as the B-side of "Stayin' Alive".

The song later appeared on the Bee Gees' compilation Their Greatest Hits: The Record. The remixed version was released and remastered in the compilation Bee Gees Greatest in 2007 and marked the return of the Bee Gees to the US Hot Dance Tracks charts after 28 years. According to Maurice, this track was the first song they did while they were recording the other songs for the film. The recording was started at Château d'Hérouville as a basic track only and completed later at Cherokee Studios in Los Angeles.

Yvonne Elliman version

The song was recorded by Yvonne Elliman for the Saturday Night Fever soundtrack.

Although Yvonne Elliman had cut her 1976 album, Love Me, with producer Freddie Perren, who was a major force in the disco movement (Perren had produced the Sylvers' 1976 number 1 "Boogie Fever" and would soon collaborate with Gloria Gaynor on the disco anthem "I Will Survive"), Love Me had showcased Elliman not as a disco artist but rather as a pop ballad singer, notably on the title cut, a Barry Gibb composition that Elliman turned into an international hit. It was originally intended that Elliman's contribution to the Saturday Night Fever soundtrack would be another ballad written by the Gibb brothers, "How Deep Is Your Love".

Meanwhile, the Bee Gees recorded their own version of "If I Can't Have You" for the film. However, RSO Records chairman and Bee Gees manager Robert Stigwood, who was executive-producing the Saturday Night Fever album, dictated that the Bee Gees record "How Deep Is Your Love" and Elliman be given the disco-style "If I Can't Have You".

Stigwood's decisions proved a success as the soundtrack's first single, the Bee Gees' version of the ballad "How Deep Is Your Love", shot to number one, followed to the top spot by the soundtrack's second and third singles, also by the Gibb brothers, "Stayin' Alive" and "Night Fever". Elliman's "If I Can't Have You", produced by Perren, was released as the fourth single off the Saturday Night Fever album in February 1978.  Billboard Magazine praised Elliman's "powerful" vocal performance.  Cash Box said that it was "pop music with a very danceable beat" and that Elliman's vocal was unique enough that it would not create confusion with any Bee Gees recording. As the first single off the Saturday Night Fever soundtrack not performed by the Bee Gees, "If I Can't Have You" would become the fourth number 1 hit from the album, reaching the number one spot on the US Hot 100 in Billboard dated 13 May 1978, ending an eight-week number 1 tenure by "Night Fever". "If I Can't Have You" was the fourth consecutive US number 1 to be co-written by Barry Gibb, and the RSO record label's sixth consecutive number one on the US Hot 100. The B-side of the Elliman single was a song from the Love Me album, "Good Sign", a composition by Melissa Manchester and Carole Bayer Sager which had also served as the B-side of Elliman's hit "Hello Stranger".

Far from the success going to Elliman's head or giving her ideas of following up the sudden disco success with a deeper foray into the genre, a contemporary interview by journalist Peter J. Boyer found Elliman dismissive of her number 1 hit, referring to it in conversation only casually as "that current thing from Saturday Night Fever". In spite of the coattail success she's had with "If I Can't Have You", it's a disco song and Elliman decided her broad, husky vocals are best suited elsewhere. "If I Can't Have You" was featured on Elliman's February 1978 album release Night Flight, which, apart from that song, was produced by Robert Appère and was not disco-oriented. No song from Night Flight was issued as a follow-up single to "If I Can't Have You", Elliman's next single being a rock ballad entitled "Savannah" which failed to consolidate Elliman's potential mainstream stardom. Elliman did return to disco music in 1979 with "Love Pains" which returned her to the US Top 40 one more time before she dropped out of the music scene in the 1980s.

Elliman's "If I Can't Have You" was also featured in the 1999 film Big Daddy as well as on its soundtrack album.

Personnel
Yvonne Elliman – lead vocals
Bob Bowles – guitar
Sonny Burke – keyboards
Paulinho da Costa – percussion
Scott Edwards – bass
James Gadson – drums
Freddie Perren – synthesizer, percussion
Julia Tillman Waters, Marti McCall, Maxine Willard Waters - backing vocals
Bob Zimmitti – percussion

Charts

Weekly charts

Year-end charts

Kim Wilde version

The song was covered in 1993 by British singer Kim Wilde and recorded as one of two new tracks on her second compilation album, The Singles Collection 1981–1993 (1993). The single reached number 12 on the UK Singles Chart and number six on the UK Dance Singles Chart. It became Wilde's biggest hit of the 1990s and one of her biggest hits in Australia, where it reached number three. In Europe the song also peaked within the top 10 in Belgium and Ireland, and within the top 20 in Iceland, the Netherlands, Italy and Switzerland. It was released in several extended remixes on the 12" and CD-single formats. The B-side was an exclusive non-album track called "Never Felt So Alive".

Critical reception
Larry Flick from Billboard called it a "NRGetic rendition", adding it as "a delicious guilty pleasure, oozing with over-the-top strings and angelic backing vocals. Kim works her program for all it's worth—and we're buying it bigtime." Pan-European magazine Music & Media commented, "The brothers Gibb—a.k.a. the Bee Gees—wrote this song for Yvonne Elliman in the heyday of disco in the end of the '70s and Wilde recycles the song in the dance era. The kids will absolutely go wild(e) on this one." Alan Jones from Music Week gave the song three out of five, writing that "this lacklustre cover lacks the finesse of the original and it won't be one of Wilde's biggest hits."

Charts

Weekly charts

Year-end charts

Certifications

If I Can't Have You (The Disco Boys remix)

On 2 November 2007, Rhino Records and Reprise Records released a remix version of "If I Can't Have You" by German house music production duo The Disco Boys. The song was released as a single from the remastered version of Bee Gees Greatest (2007), originally released in 1979, and reached the US Hot Dance Club Play chart, peaking at #47 in January 2008.

Track listing
Digital download — US version
"If I Can't Have You" (The Disco Boys remix) – 6:55

CD single
"If I Can't Have You" (The Disco Boys radio edit) – 3:36
"If I Can't Have You" (The Disco Boys remix) – 6:35
"If I Can't Have You" – 3:22
"If I Can't Have You" (The Disco Boys dub mix) – 6:55

Charts

Jess Glynne version

In 2016, English singer and songwriter Jess Glynne re-recorded "If I Can't Have You" in support of the French musical Saturday Night Fever, which was to premiere in 2017. Warner Music France released her rendition as a digital single on 22 May 2016.

Track listing

Charts

Release history

References

External links
 

1977 songs
1977 singles
1978 singles
1993 singles
2016 singles
British disco songs
Bee Gees songs
Yvonne Elliman songs
Kim Wilde songs
Jess Glynne songs
Billboard Hot 100 number-one singles
Cashbox number-one singles
RPM Top Singles number-one singles
Songs from Saturday Night Fever
Songs written by Barry Gibb
Songs written by Maurice Gibb
Songs written by Robin Gibb
Song recordings produced by Barry Gibb
Song recordings produced by Robin Gibb
Song recordings produced by Maurice Gibb
RSO Records singles
Polydor Records singles
MCA Records singles
Torch songs